Hyla surinamensis is a species of frog that was described by Francois-Marie Daudin based on an illustration of a frog from "Suriname". Probably depicting some species in the treefrog subfamily Hylinae, it is considered a nomen dubium.

This taxon was assessed as "data deficient" for The IUCN Red List of Threatened Species in 2004. As of 2020, it is no longer included in the list.

References

Hylinae
Amphibians described in 1802
Taxa named by François Marie Daudin
Taxonomy articles created by Polbot
Taxobox binomials not recognized by IUCN